Patrick Clerc (born 20 September 1957) is a French former professional racing cyclist. He rode in four editions of the Tour de France and one edition of the Vuelta a España.

References

External links
 

1957 births
Living people
French male cyclists
Sportspeople from La Tronche
Cyclists from Auvergne-Rhône-Alpes